Mae Hong Son province (Burmese: မဲဟောင်ဆောင်; , ;;; formerly called Mae Rong Son), also spelled Maehongson, Mae Hong Sorn or Maehongsorn, is one of Thailand's seventy-six provinces (changwat). It lies in upper northern Thailand and is the westernmost province. Neighboring provinces are (clockwise from north) Shan State of Myanmar, Chiang Mai and Tak. To the west, the province borders Kayin State and Kayah State of Myanmar.
Mae Hong Son's nickname is "the city of three mists". It is hemmed in by the high mountain ranges of the Shan Hills and is the most mountainous province in Thailand, occupying . The province is often covered with mist. Mae Hong Son town was originally established in the early 19th century as an elephant training camp as ordered by the then King of Chiang Mai.
, Mae Hong Son was the poorest province in Thailand.

Geography

Location
To the north and west it connects to a total of three states in the Union of Burma, namely the southern portion of Shan State, Kayah State, and Kawthoolei State, via the Dawna Range, and the Salween and Moei Rivers. These formations serve as natural boundaries between the countries. To the south, it borders the district of Tha Song Yang and Tak, via the rivers Yuam and Ngao, which serve as a provincial boundary. To the east it borders the districts of Wiang Haeng, Chiang Dao, Mae Taeng, Mae Chaem, Hot and Omkoi in Chiang Mai province, via the central and east sections of the Thanon Thongchai mountain ranges, which serve as a boundary between the two provinces.

Every district in Mae Hong Son province shares a common border, measuring approximately 483 kilometres in total length, with Myanmar.

Topography
Most of the areas of Mae Hong Son province are the complex mountain ranges of the Thai highlands, parts of which are still covered with rainforest.

The Daen Lao Range, in the northernmost portion of the province, marks the northern boundary between Thailand and Burma, while the Dawna Range in the west serves as the boundary between Thailand and Burma. The Thanon Thongchai Range in the east of the province serves as the boundary between the provinces of Mae Hong Son and Chiang Mai. The highest point of the province is Doi Mae Ya (ยอดเขาแม่ยะ), in the Pai District in the province's northeast, at  elevation.

Climate
Mae Hong Son province has a tropical savanna climate (Köppen climate classification category Aw). Winters are dry and warm. Temperatures rise until May. Monsoon season runs from May through October, with heavy rain and somewhat cooler temperatures during the day, although nights remain warm. Temperature statistics: Its maximum temperature is 44.6 °C (112.3 °F) on 28 April 2016 and the lowest temperature is 3.9 °C (39.0 °F). The highest average temperature is 35.6 °C (96.1 °F) on 25 December 1999 and the minimum average temperature is 18.0 °C (64.4 °F). The average relative humidity is 96.99% and the minimum relative humidity is 20%. Annual rainfall is 1,064.9 millimeters and on 23 April 1968 was for 24 hour the rainfall 130.4 mm. The number of rainy days was 130 days for a year.Weather box Mae Hong Son and Weather box Mae Sariang

National parks

 Huai Nam Dang National Park, 
 Salawin National Park, 
 Tham Pla-Namtok Phu Suea National park, 
 Namtok Mae Surin National Park, 
 Mae Ngao National park (preparation), 
 Mae Sariang Mational Park (preparation),

Wildlife sanctuaries
 Lum Nam Pai Wildlife Sanctuary, 
 Salawin Wildlife Sanctuary, 
 Mae Lao-Mae Sae Wildlife Sanctuary, 
 Doi Wiang La Wildlife Sanctuary, 
 Mae Yuam Fang Khwa Wildlife Sanctuary, 
 San Pan Daen Wildlife Sanctuary,

Water resources
There are 31 water reservoirs with total capacity of 12.31 million cubic meters:

 Huai So Tue, capacity 1,880,000 m3
 Huai Fai Kho, capacity 950,000 m3
 Huai Mae Hong Son, cap. 734,000 m3.
 Huai Mae Salap, cap. 700,000 m3.

There are 617 groundwater wells, which are used to mine groundwater for general use.

Mineral resources
Among the minerals that have been discovered in the province are limestone, coal, lignite, lead, zinc, tin, tungsten, antimony, fluoride, and feldspar. The mineral area is approximately 2,440 km2 (19% of provincial area).

History
Mae Hong Son province was formerly part of Mawkmai State, one of the Shan States which had been founded in 1767 by Hsai Khiao, from a noble family of Chiang Mai.

As a result of the Anglo-Siamese Boundary Commission of 1892–1893, Mae Hong Son District was ceded to Siam, but the adjacent Möngmaü and Mehsakun trans-Salween Districts also claimed by Siam (as territories on the eastern side of the Salween River), were kept as part of British Burma.

Environment
The Thai government, to solve persistent water shortages in the central region, have proposed a 70.7 billion baht plan to divert some 1.8 billion m3 of water annually from the Yuam River to the perennially underfilled Bhumibol Dam. Several of the province's districts would impacted. As part of the plan, the Royal Irrigation Department (RID), would build 69 metre high dam with a storage capacity of 68.7 million m3 constructed on 2,075 rai of forest land, together with a pumping station on a separate 55 rai plot and a 61.5 kilometre-long tunnel passing through 14 villages. The inhabitants of the area—primarily Karen tribes people—largely oppose the project. In December 2019, the RID submitted a second environmental impact assessment (EIA) to the Office of the Natural Resources and Environmental Policy and Planning (ONEP). ONEP rejected the EIA for the second time due to concerns about forest destruction, tunnel rock waste, and compensation issues.

Administrative divisions

Provincial government
The province is divided into seven districts (amphoes). These are further divided into 45 subdistricts (tambons) and 415 villages (mubans).

Local government
As of 26 November 2019 there are: one Mae Hong Son Provincial Administration Organisation and seven municipal (thesaban) areas in the province. Mae Hong Son has town (thesaban mueang) status. There are a further six subdistrict municipalities (thesaban tambon). The non-municipal areas are administered by 42 Subdistrict Administrative Organisations (SAO) (ongkan borihan suan tambon).

Demographics

Ethnic diversity
Shan people is the largest population group in the province. They migrated from Shan State in Myanmar. Further there are seven hill tribes which consists of 63% of the provincial population: Karen, Lahu, Lisu, Lua, Miao, Chinese Yunnan and Pa-O people.

The Karen are not a single group, but rather a mix of closely related tribes. Among the smallest of the Karen tribes in Thailand are Kayan Lahwi. This group's women are recognized by the large brass rings they wear around their necks. Population density is 22 persons per km2, the lowest of all provinces.

Language
 Tai Yai people speak their own language. The written language with round alphabets is like Mon and Burmese script. 
 Karen and Chinese Haw have their own spoken and written language. 
 Lahu, Lisu and Lua people have their own spoken language, but their written language uses the Latin alphabet.

Religion
Most inhabitants, 77.5%, are Buddhists, followed by Christians at 20.9%, and Muslims at 0.5%. About 1.1% believe in animism and other religions.

Symbols
The provincial seal, Rup chang nai thong nam (รูปช้างในท้องน้ำ), meaning 'image of an elephant in a body of water', is a reference to the training of wild elephants for battle and various types of animal labour. "Rup chang nai thong nam" was selected as the provincial seal because it refers to Mae Hong Son's founding, which began with Lord Kaeo of Ma being sent to capture elephants for the Lord of Chiang Mai (1825–1846). Once in Mae Hong Son, he gathered the scattered Shan settlements to establish two main villages, Ban Pang Mu and Ban Mae Hong Son, that would be ruled by their elected leaders.

The provincial flag is horizontally divided in dark brown/blue/dark brown (1:3:1) with the image of the provincial seal in the middle of the flag.

The provincial tree is the Millettia brandisiana.

The provincial flower is the Tree marigold.

The provincial animal is the Blyth's river frog.

The official provincial slogan promoted by the Thai government is หมอกสามฤดู กองมูเสียดฟ้า ป่าเขียวขจี ผู้คนดี ประเพณีงาม ลือนามถิ่นบัวตอง
() 'Mists throughout the three seasons, the Kong Mu (monastery) that scrapes the sky, verdant forests, gentle people, beautiful customs; renowned land of marigolds'.

Infrastructure

Education
Higher educational institutions are:
 Chiang Mai Rajabhat University, Mae Hong Son campus.
 Mae Hong Son Community College.
 Nawamintrachinaracha Industrial and Community Education College.
 Mae Sariang Industrial and Community Education College.

There are eight secondary schools in Mae Hong Son.

Healthcare
Every district has a hospital. There are also 72 subdistrict health-promoting hospitals. There are 63 public health centers, 10 insect-induced disease control centers, 15 malaria clinics, 21 community malaria centers and one health service (Thanyarak Mae Hong Son hospital).

Transportation

Roads
There are four major roads in the province:
 Hot District of Chiang Mai to Mae Hong Son, distance 345 km
 Mae Tang District of Chiang Mai province to Mae Hong Son, distance 246 km.
 Mae Sot District of Tak province to Mae Hong Son.
 Mae Chaem District of Chiang Mai province to Khun Yuam District of Mae Hong Son province, distance 90 km.

Public transport
Two bus companies (Prem Pracha Transport Co and Sombat Tour Co.) operate four bus services:
 Bangkok - Mae Hong Son, distance is 928 km, travel time is 17 hours.
 Chiang Mai - Mae Sariang - Mae Hong Son, distance is 359 km, travel time is eight hours.
 Chiang Mai (Pai District) - Mae Hong Son, distance is 250 km, travel time is six hours.
 Mae Sot District of Tak province - Mae Sariang District of Mae Hong Son.

Air transport
Bangkok Airways provides daily flights between Chiang Mai International Airport and Mae Hong Son Airport. From 2011 until April 2017 Kan Air provided flights between Chiang Mai International Airport and Pai Airport.

Electricity
Mae Hong Son is supplied with electricity from power stations in Chiang Mai province (Districts Chom Thong, Hot and Mae Taeng), along with eight power plants in Mae Hong Son province:

 Pha Bong Dam Hydro Plant
 Mae Sa Nga Dam Hydro Plant
 Mae Sariang Hydro Plant
 Mae Hong Son Diesel Power Plant
 Pha Bong Solar Power Plant

In 2015, 83% of households were electrified and the remainder were without electricity.

Communications
As of 2018 there were 65,153 households, of which 2.1% used telephones, 15.2% used computers with no internet connection, and 45.5% used computers with internet. As of 2018 there were 182,615 people aged six years and older, of which 22.2% used computers, 38.9% the internet, and 81.3% used mobile phones.

Human achievement index 2017

Since 2003, United Nations Development Programme (UNDP) in Thailand has tracked progress on human development at sub-national level using the Human achievement index (HAI), a composite index covering all the eight key areas of human development. National Economic and Social Development Board (NESDB) has taken over this task since 2017.

Events and festivals 
Poi Sang Long Procession (งานประเพณีปอยส่างลอง)
Chong Phara Procession (งานประเพณีจองพารา)
Bua Tong Blossom Festival (งานวันดอกบัวตองบาน)
Loi Krathong Festival (ประเพณีลอยกระทง หรือ งานเหลินสิบสอง)
Small World Festival http://www.sawadee.com/thailand/festivals/festival12.html

Gallery

See also 
 Nai Soi Community Learning Center

References

Further reading
 "A Season in Mae Hong Son", in: Forbes, Andrew, and Henley, David, Ancient Chiang Mai Volume 3. Chiang Mai, Cognoscenti Books, 2012. ASIN: B006IN1RNW

External links

Tourist Authority of Thailand official website page
Provincial symbols

 
Provinces of Thailand